The Green God is a 1918 American silent mystery film directed by Paul Scardon and starring Harry T. Morey, Betty Blythe and Arthur Donaldson.

Cast
 Harry T. Morey as Owen Morgan 
 Betty Blythe as Muriel Temple 
 Arthur Donaldson as Major Temple 
 George Majeroni as Robert Ashton 
 Bernard Siegel as Li Min 
 Robert Gaillard as McQuade 
 Joseph Burke as Priest of Buddha

References

Bibliography
 Goble, Alan. The Complete Index to Literary Sources in Film. Walter de Gruyter, 1999.

External links
 

1918 films
1918 mystery films
American silent feature films
American mystery films
Films directed by Paul Scardon
American black-and-white films
Vitagraph Studios films
1910s English-language films
1910s American films
Silent mystery films